Family Style is an American reality television series that was premiered on Food Network on August 22, 2010. The show centers around an Italian restaurateur family, The Maggiores, in Carlsbad, California. The series focuses on the brother and sister Joey and Melissa opening their first restaurant, Tommy V's, together. Melissa is the more strait-laced and is in charge of running the restaurant. Joey is the flashy one who is in charge of cooking in the kitchen. Their different styles constantly collide.

Episodes

References

External links

2010 American television series debuts
2010s American cooking television series
2010 American television series endings
2010s American reality television series
English-language television shows
Food Network original programming
Food reality television series
Television shows set in San Diego